Amanda Dennis may refer to:

Amanda Dennis (goalball), American goalball player
Amanda Dennis (soccer), American former soccer player